Neurotica may refer to:

Neurotica, 1998–2001 Modern Living Han Hoogerbrugge 
Neurotica (magazine) Beat era magazine
Neurotica, novel by Sue Margolis  
Neurotica (band)
Neurotica (album), by Redd Kross
"Neurotica", song by King Crimson from Beat
"Neurotica", song by Rush from Roll the Bones
"Neurotica", song by Keziah Jones from Black Orpheus Limited Edition
"Neurotica", song by Cud (band)
"Neurotica", song by Meshuggah from Chaosphere
"Neurotica", song by Polyphia from Remember That You Will Die
"Neurotica", comic strip by Allison "Big Al, the gal" Garwood